Aquinas College is a state-integrated Designated Special Character school on the southwestern outskirts of Tauranga City, New Zealand. It is a Roman Catholic co-educational school that combines intermediate and college (years 7–13). It was founded in 2003 with St. Thomas Aquinas as its patron saint. The proprietor of the school, which is a State-integrated school, is the Bishop of Hamilton. The school's founding principal was Brendon Schollum (2003–2010).

Principals 
 Brendon Schollum: 2003–2010
 Ray Scott: 2010–2017
 Matthew Dalton: 2018–Present

House system 
The school has four houses. They are:
 Browne ( Purple)
 Cluny  (Blue)
 Foy  (Gold)
 Heni Pore  (Red)
Each house is represented by a different colour (as seen above). Each represents a well known Catholic figure/s. These are prominent individuals in the Catholic church who have demonstrated the school's touchstones throughout their lives. Browne House is named after Bishop Denis Browne, Heni Pore House is named after Heni Pore Karamu, Cluny House is named after The Cluny Sisters, and Foy House is named after Father Pat Foy. Each house is split into seven tutor classes (one for each year level).

A house championship is fiercely contested for throughout the school year, with several annual events for students to gain points for their house. These events consist of schoolwide athletics day, swimming sports, cross country, sing/dance competition and haka/waiata competition. Students compete to earn points for their house by (participation/placing) in these events. A house championship winner is announced at the end of the school year, house leaders are awarded the coveted 'Interhouse cup' for earning the most points.

Sport 
Aquinas fields numerous teams across a wide range of sports, with many teams and individuals representing the College regionally and nationally, including: basketball, rugby, hockey, rock climbing, sailing, surf lifesaving, touch rugby, windsurfing, badminton, cross country, water polo, netball, football, gymnastics, squash, cricket, golf, multi-sports, swimming, snow sports, track running, volleyball, tennis, rowing and air-pistol shooting.

Curriculum 
NCEA levels 1, 2 and 3 are offered for years ten to thirteen. An accelerate year 10 class in the subjects of science and math undergo NCEA level 1 work similar to year 11 students. Religious Education is compulsory as a subject for all students.

Touchstones 
Aquinas College has six touchstones, which are values shown by students, staff and the wider college community: Family, Scholarship, Service, Truth, Prayer, and Joy.

The school's 'Touchstone Award' is awarded to a Year 13 student who displays the school's touchstones at the end of the school year.

Alumni

 Adam Ling (born 1991) – rower; won a gold medal at the 2015 World Rowing Championships in the lightweight single sculls.
 Justin Sangster – professional rugby union player.

See also 
 Aquinas College Website
List of schools in New Zealand
 Roman Catholic Diocese of Hamilton in New Zealand

References

External links 
 Aquinas College Website
 Diocese of Hamilton in New Zealand Catholic-Hierarchy

Educational institutions established in 2003
Catholic secondary schools in New Zealand
Intermediate schools in New Zealand
Schools in Tauranga
Secondary schools in the Bay of Plenty Region
2003 establishments in New Zealand